Sonwabo Qengeba Majola (born 20 March 1993 in Uitenhage) is a South African rugby union player for the  in the Currie Cup and in the Rugby Challenge. His regular position is scrum-half, but also played as a fly-half at school level.

Career

Youth

In 2012, he helped the  side to the Under-19 Provincial Championship Division B final, starting eight matches in the competition. The following year, he went one better by winning the Under-21 Provincial Championship Division B competition with the  team, narrowly losing out on promotion to Division A.

Senior career

References

South African rugby union players
Living people
1993 births
People from Uitenhage
Eastern Province Elephants players
Rugby union scrum-halves
Rugby union players from the Eastern Cape